Izumrud (meaning "Emerald") was a protected cruiser of the Imperial Russian Navy, and the lead ship in the two-ship . Izumrud and her sister ship  were based on the German-built .

Background
Izumrud was ordered as part of the Imperial Russian Navy's plan to expand the Russian Pacific Fleet based at Port Arthur and Vladivostok to counter the growing threat posed by the Imperial Japanese Navy towards Russian hegemony in Manchuria and Korea.

Operational history
Izumrud was laid down at the Nevsky Shipyard in Saint Petersburg, Russia on 1 January 1901. The Zakladka, or formal ceremony of laying a plate, took place on 14 June 1902. Izumrud was launched on 1 October 1903. Construction continued to be plagued by delays, including an ice storm in December. However, with the start of the Russo-Japanese War in early 1904, construction efforts were greatly accelerated.

Izumrud was formally commissioned in January 1904 and she was assigned to the Second Pacific Squadron of the Russian Pacific Fleet.

During the Russo-Japanese War
Under the overall command of Admiral Zinovy Rozhestvensky, Izumrud was part of the Second Pacific Squadron intended to relieve the Japanese siege of Port Arthur. Captained by Commander Vasili Fersen, she participated in the decisive Battle of Tsushima from 27–28 May 1905. At the end of the battle, Fersen refused to obey the order of Admiral Nikolai Nebogatov to surrender, and used her speed to escape through the Japanese blockade. However, on the night of 28 May, she ran aground in  Vladimir Bay  in the Russian Maritime Province. She was destroyed by explosive charges set by her crew, who later reached Vladivostok by land.

Notes

References

External links

Izumrud-class cruisers
1903 ships
Ships built at Sredne-Nevskiy Shipyard
Cruisers of the Imperial Russian Navy
Naval ships of Russia
Russo-Japanese War cruisers of Russia
Maritime incidents in 1905
Shipwrecks in the Sea of Japan
Shipwrecks of the Russo-Japanese War